The Redmi Note 11 is a line of Android-based smartphones as part of the Redmi Note series by Redmi, a sub-brand of Xiaomi Inc.

In India Chinese variant of Redmi Note 11 Pro and Note 11 Pro+ are sold as Xiaomi 11i (not to be confused with Mi 11i) and Xiaomi 11i HyperCharge in accordance.

In November 2021, Poco M4 Pro 5G was announced. It was based on redmi Note 11 5G but with MicroSD card slot, different design and more storage configuration. In March 2022, was announced Redmi Note 11S 5G which has same design as Redmi Note 11 5G but also has MicroSD card slot, different camera setup and more storage configuration.

On MWC 2022 were introduced new Poco smartphones: Poco M4 Pro and Poco X4 Pro 5G. First is based on Redmi Note 11S but has different design, camera setup and bigger memory configuration. Poco X4 Pro 5G is based on Redmi Note 11 Pro 5G but has different design and bigger memory configuration. Indian version of Poco X4 Pro 5G has 64MP camera instead of 108MP in global version.

In China Redmi Note 11 Pro 5G was introduced as Redmi Note 11E Pro, while in India it was introduced as Redmi Note 11 Pro+ 5G.

List 
As of June 2022, there are 16 variants of Redmi Note 11 phones, and they are:

 Redmi Note 11
 Redmi Note 11 5G
 Redmi Note 11 4G
 Redmi Note 11S
 Redmi Note 11S 5G
 Redmi Note 11 Pro
 Redmi Note 11 Pro (China)
 Redmi Note 11 Pro 5G
 Redmi Note 11 Pro+ 5G
 Redmi Note 11 Pro+ 5G (India)
 Redmi Note 11E
 Redmi Note 11E Pro
 Redmi Note 11T 5G
 Redmi Note 11T Pro
 Redmi Note 11T Pro+
 Redmi Note 11SE

Design 
Redmi Note 11, 11S, 11 5G, Poco M4 Pro and M4 Pro 5G have front made of Gorilla Glass 3 and plastic back. Other models have front and back made of Gorilla Glass 5. All phones have flat plastic frame except Redmi Note 11 5G and POCO M4 Pro 5G.

The design of the global lineup is something average between Redmi Note 10 series and Mi 10T, while in the Chinese lineup it is similar to Redmi Note 10 Pro 5G. The back panel in Redmi Note 11, 11S and 11 5G is curved, while in other models — flat.

Poco M4 Pro and X4 Pro 5G have a similar to Poco M3 and Mi 11 Ultra design with camera unit on the full width of the back panel.

On the bottom side of Redmi Note 11, 11S and Poco M4 Pro there are USB-C ports, speakers, microphone and 3.5mm audio jack. On the top side there are additional microphone, IR blaster and second speaker. On the left side there is dual SIM tray with microSD slot. On the right side there are volume rocker and power button with mounted fingerprint scanner.

In other models, on the bottom side, there are USB-C port, speaker, microphone and hybrid dual SIM tray (SIM1 + SIM 2 or SIM1 + microSD) in Note 11 Pro, Note 11 Pro+ and 11 Pro 5G and dual SIM tray in Chinese Note 11 Pro. On the top side, there are 3.5mm audio jack, additional microphone, IR blaster and second speaker. On the right side there are volume rocker and power button with mounted fingerprint scanner.

Specifications

Hardware 
The device is large 159.9 × 73.9 × 8.1 millimetre and weighs 179 grams. It has a Qualcomm SM6225 Snapdragon 680 4G, with Octa-core CPUs and Adreno GPU 610. Redmi Note 11 and Note 11S have 6.2 inches FHD+ display and 5000 mAh Li-Po battery.

Software 
For the Redmi Note 11, 11S, 11S 5G, 11 Pro, 11 Pro 5G (also known as Redmi Note 11 Pro+ in India), the operating system is Android 11 with MIUI 13, while for Redmi Note 11 5G, 11 Pro (China) and 11 Pro+, the operating system is Android 11 with MIUI 12.5. All devices were updated to MIUI 13 based on Android 12.

The devices will end its Android updates with the Android 13.

References

External links 
 
 
 
 
 
 
 
 
 

Android (operating system) devices
Redmi smartphones
Mobile phones with multiple rear cameras
Mobile phones with infrared transmitter
Mobile phones introduced in 2022